Lysimachia × producta is a hybrid of flowering plants in the primrose family Primulaceae. It is native to eastern North America, from Quebec south to North Carolina, as far west as Wisconsin. The hybrid specific epithet producta means "stretched out, extended", a reference to the shape of its inflorescence. Indeed, the hybrid is sometimes referred to as the elongated loosestrife.

Description

The flowers are 5-merous with yellow petals, streaked with reddish or reddish-black markings. The filaments are shorter than the petals.

The parents of Lysimachia × producta are L. quadrifolia and L. terrestris. The flowers of the hybrid and its parents are very similar but overall L. × producta more closely resembles L. terrestris since both have terminal racemes. The two may be distinguished by the length of the raceme, the length of the pedicels, and whorled (as opposed to opposite) leaves.

References

External links

 

producta
Plants described in 1899
Taxa named by Asa Gray
Taxa named by Merritt Lyndon Fernald
Plant nothospecies